Sport Loreto is a local football institution located in Pucallpa, Peru. It was founded in 1939, and it will start playing in the first professional division in 2015. After the championship in Copa Peru 2014. Football is the most played sport, although there are other local sport as Volleyball that also participates in the National Championships. Another sport being played is Basketball. Football is being played at the local stadium Aliardo Soria.

History
In the 2006 Copa Perú, the club made it to the Regional Stage, but was eliminated by Colegio Nacional Iquitos and Hospital.

In the 2013 Copa Perú, the club made it to the National Stage, but was eliminated by Unión Huaral in the quarter-finals.

In the 2014 Copa Perú, the club defeated Fuerza Minera in the finals.

In the 2015 Torneo Descentralizado, the club was relegated to the 2016 Peruvian Segunda División.

Rivalries
Sport Loreto has had a long-standing rivalry with Deportivo Bancos.

Honours

National
Copa Perú:
Winners (1): 2014

Regional
Región III:
Winners (2): 2013, 2014

Liga Departamental de Loreto:
Winners (1): 1973

Liga Departamental de Ucayali:
Winners (3): 2006, 2013, 2014

Liga Provincial de Coronel Portillo:
Winners (5): 1955, 1973, 1974, 2006, 2013

Current squad
As of 2016.

See also
List of football clubs in Peru
Peruvian football league system

External links
 Los 16 expedientes
 La selva si tiene estrellas

 
Association football clubs established in 1939
Football clubs in Peru